Joerg Henkel is an engineer at the Karlsruhe Institute of Technology, Germany. He was named a Fellow of the Institute of Electrical and Electronics Engineers (IEEE) in 2015 for his contributions to hardware and software codesign of embedded computing systems.

References

Fellow Members of the IEEE
Living people
Year of birth missing (living people)
Place of birth missing (living people)
Academic staff of the Karlsruhe Institute of Technology